Sunndal Fotball is a Norwegian association football club from Sunndalsøra, Møre og Romsdal.

It was separated from the multi-sports club Sunndal IL (founded 1918) in 1992.

Men's team
The men's football team currently plays in the 4. divisjon, the fifth tier of Norwegian football, since their relegation from 3. divisjon in 2019. It last played in the 2. divisjon in 2000. In 2010 it contested a playoff to win promotion, but failed.

Recent seasons
{|class="wikitable"
|-bgcolor="#efefef"
! Season
! 
! Pos.
! Pl.
! W
! D
! L
! GS
! GA
! P
!Cup
!Notes
|-
|2017
|4. divisjon
|align=right| 3
|align=right|22||align=right|15||align=right|1||align=right|6
|align=right|80||align=right|41||align=right|46
||First qualifying round
|
|-
|2018
|4. divisjon
|align=right bgcolor=#DDFFDD| 1
|align=right|22||align=right|14||align=right|6||align=right|2
|align=right|68||align=right|25||align=right|48
||First round
|Promoted to 3. divisjon
|-
|2019
|3. divisjon
|align=right bgcolor="#FFCCCC"| 13
|align=right|26||align=right|5||align=right|5||align=right|16
|align=right|36||align=right|67||align=right|20
||Second round
|Relegated to 4. divisjon
|}

Women's team
The women's football team currently plays in the Second Division, the third tier of Norwegian football. In 2010 it contested a playoff to win promotion to the First Division, but failed.

References

 Official site 

Football clubs in Norway
Sport in Møre og Romsdal
Association football clubs established in 1992
1992 establishments in Norway